The Great Acceleration is the dramatic, continuous and roughly simultaneous surge across a large range of measures of human activity, first recorded in the mid-20th century and continuing to this day. Within the concept of the proposed epoch of the Anthropocene, these measures are specifically those of humanity's impact on Earth's geology and its ecosystems. In the concept, the Great Acceleration can be variously classified as the only age of the epoch to date, one of many ages of the epoch – depending on the epoch's proposed start date – or a defining feature of the epoch that is thus not an age, as well as other classifications.

Environmental historian J. R. McNeill has argued that the Great Acceleration is idiosyncratic of the current age and is set to halt in the near future; that it has never happened before and will never happen again. However, climate change scientist and chemist Will Steffen's team have found evidence to be inconclusive to either confirm or refute such a claim.

Related to Great Acceleration is the concept of accelerating change. While not explicitly commenting on whether the Great Acceleration as a whole is set to continue into the near future, the common implication is that the particular trend of accelerating progress will not cease until technological singularity is achieved, at which point technological growth becomes uncontrollable and irreversible, resulting in unfathomable changes to the Earth and possibly even the universe itself. Therefore, while adherents of the theory of accelerating change do not comment on the short-term fate of the Great Acceleration, they do hold that its eventual fate is continuation, which also contradicts McNeill's conclusions.

Overview

In tracking the effects of human activity upon the Earth, a number of socioeconomic and earth system parameters are utilized including population, economics, water usage, food production, transportation, technology, greenhouse gases, surface temperature, and natural resource usage. The Anthropocene is typically depicted as following the Holocene, to emphasize the central role of humankind in geology and ecology. Since 1950, these trends are increasing significantly if not exponentially.

Data classification categories

The International Geosphere-Biosphere Programme (IGBP) has divided and analyzed data from years 1750 to 2010 into two broad categories, each with 12 subcategories.  The first category of socioeconomic trend data illustrates the impact on the second, the earth system trend data.

Socioeconomic trends

 Population
 Real GDP
 Foreign direct investment
 Urban population
 Primary energy use
 Fertilizer consumption
 Large dams
 Water use
 Paper production
 Transportation
 Telecommunications
 International tourism
 Technology

Earth system trends

 Carbon dioxide
 Nitrous oxide
 Methane
 Stratospheric ozone
 Surface temperature
 Ocean acidification
 Marine fish capture
 Shrimp aquaculture
 Nitrogen to  coastal zone
 Tropical forest loss
 Domesticated land
 Terrestrial biosphere degradation

See also

References

Holocene